The Tower Burbank is a commercial high-rise building in Burbank, California. At 460 feet, it is the tallest building in the city and is the 59th tallest building in California. The Tower can be seen from the Ventura Freeway.  In 2014, the building was purchased by Worthe Real Estate Group for $109,000,000. The Walt Disney Company was a major tenant until 2013 when they decided to move their offices at The Tower to their other locations in Burbank and Glendale.

See also 
 List of Tallest Buildings in California

References 

Buildings and structures in Burbank, California
Office buildings in California
Office buildings completed in 1988
1988 establishments in California